Dalnavert, also known as MacDonald House, is a historic house museum located in Winnipeg, Manitoba, Canada. It was designated as a National Historic Site of Canada in 1990.

History 
Built in 1895 on Hudson's Bay Company Reserve land, it was the home of Hugh John Macdonald, former Premier of Manitoba and son of Canadian Prime Minister John A. Macdonald; his wife Gertrude Agnes VanKoughnet; and their children, Daisy and Jack. The house is an example of Queen Anne Revival architecture, and it has been furnished for the late Victoria era. It was restored by the Manitoba Historical Society, and it is currently operated by the Friends of Dalnavert.

It was temporarily closed in November 2013, but was reopened in May 2015  thanks to extensive community support and campaigning by the Friends of Dalnavert. It is now a tourist attraction, especially at Christmas time.

The Dalnavert Museum is open to visitors year round. Summer hours are 10:00 a.m. - 4:00 p.m. Wednesday to Sunday, and 12:00 p.m. - 4:00 p.m. Wednesday to Sunday during the winter. The museum is affiliated with the CMA,  CHIN, and Virtual Museum of Canada.

References

Museums in Winnipeg
National Historic Sites in Manitoba
Historic house museums in Manitoba
Queen Anne architecture in Canada
Buildings and structures in downtown Winnipeg
Municipal Historical Resources of Winnipeg